Black Taurus (born March 11, 1987) is a Mexican luchador enmascarado, or masked professional wrestler, He is currently under contract with Lucha Libre AAA Worldwide, in addition to making appearances for Impact Wrestling.

He is primarily known for his work for Lucha Libre AAA Worldwide, International Wrestling Revolution Group, Lucha Libre Elite, The Crash Lucha Libre, Impact Wrestling, Major League Wrestling, Pro Wrestling Guerrilla as well as on the Mexican and independent circuit. His real name is not a matter of public record as is often the case with masked wrestlers in Mexico.

Professional wrestling career

Consejo Mundial de Lucha Libre (2008–2011)
After wrestling for years in the Torreón area under the name Semental, he would move to Mexico City in 2008. After a short stint with International Wrestling Revolution Group, he would start working in Consejo Mundial de Lucha Libre in March 2008. He wrestled regularly for CMLL for over three years, generally working opening matches that rarely made TV. He had his last match for the promotion on June 28, 2011 and then showed up in AAA two days later.

Lucha Libre AAA Worldwide (2012–2016)
He made his AAA debut June 30 in Tizayuca, still under the name Semental. He would have two more TV matches for the promotion in 2011. 

In mid-2012 AAA introduced a new masked trio known as Los Inferno Rockers (Machine Rocker, Devil Rocker and Soul Rocker), a trio of masked, glam-rocker inspired wrestlers who resembled the rock band Kiss. It was later verified that the former Tito Santana was under the Soul Rocker mask. The trio was set up as the rivals of Los Psycho Circus (Psycho Clown, Murder Clown and Monster Clown), who at the time had been undefeated for years. It was later revealed that Uro Rocker was supposed to be the main rival of Psycho Clown, but the wrestler playing the part hurt wrestlers he worked with and was quickly dropped from the group.

The group lost to Los Psycho Circus at the 2012 Guerra de Titanes show, their first appearance at a major AAA show. 18 days later the trio wrestled International Wrestling Revolution Group's Los Oficiales (Oficial 911, Oficial AK-47 and Oficial Fierro) in one of the featured matches on the Arena Naucalpan 35th Anniversary Show when the match ended in a double pinfall. In early 2013 Los Inferno Rockers finally defeated Los Psycho Circus, gaining some momentum in their ongoing feud. They repeated the feat at the 2012 Rey de Reyes show, seemingly escalating their feud towards a Lucha de Apuestas, or "bet match" where the teams would put their masks on the line. The Apuestas match never happened and Los Inferno Rockers were soon diverted from Los Psycho Circus. In later 2013 Devil Rocker left AAA and was replaced by Demon Rocker to remain a trio. a member of the Los Inferno Rockers stable. The team was phased out throughout 2014, with Demon Rocker taking over the "La Parka Negra" character. By early 2015 Machine Rocker no longer appeared on AAA shows either. On October 4, 2015 Machine Rocker was repackaged and introduced as "Taurus", signaling the end of Los Inferno Rockers as a unit won a Royal Rumble Lumberjack match to win the Copa Antonio Peña.

On September 10, 2016, Taurus announced his departure from AAA.

Lucha Libre Elite (2016)
Taurus debut as Black Tauro with Lucha Libre Elite teaming with Cibernetico and Sharlie Rockstar was defeated by Decnis, Mr. Aguila & Zumbido. On November 10, Tauro teaming with Rey Escorpión defeat L.A. Park & Mr. Aguila.

Return to AAA (2018–present)
On June 1, 2018, Taurus returned to the AAA after helping to retain the AAA Reina de Reinas Championship of Faby Apache, in front of Ashley. On August 10, 2019, Taurus lost a title match for the AAA Mega Championship to champion Fénix, the match also included Laredo Kid and Puma King.

Impact Wrestling (2019, 2021–present)
Due to AAA's alliance with American promotion Impact Wrestling, Taurus made a special appearance on the February 1, 2019 edition of Impact Wrestling, which was taped January 11–12, 2019 at Mexico City's Frontón México Entertainment Center, teaming with Lucha Brothers (Pentagon Jr. & Fénix) defeated The Latin American Exchange (Ortiz & Santana) and Daga.

On the February 9, 2021 edition of Impact Wrestling, Taurus made his return to Impact Wrestling on a more regular basis, when Rosemary and Crazzy Steve introduced him as the newest member of their stable Decay, soon afterwards picking up a quick victory over Kaleb with a K.

Major League Wrestling (2019)
On March 2, 2019 at MLW Fusion, Taurus made his debut in Major League Wrestling teaming with Laredo Kid, losing to Lucha Brothers (Pentagon Jr. & Rey Fenix).

Pro Wrestling Guerrilla (2019–present)
On July 26, 2019 at the "SIXTEEN" event, Taurus made his debut at Pro Wrestling Guerrilla (PWG), losing with Laredo Kid and Puma King against Mexablood (Bandido & Flamita) and Rey Horus.

Championships and accomplishments
Lucha Libre AAA Worldwide
AAA Latin American Championship (1 time)
 AAA World Trios Championship (1 time) – with La Hiedra and Rey Escorpión
 Copa Antonio Peña (2015)
 Gladiators Heavyweight Tournament (2019)
Lucha Libre VOZ
VOZ Ultra Championship (1 time, current)
Perros del Mal Producciones
Perros del Mal Heavyweight Championship (1 time)
Perros del Mal Light Heavyweight Championship (1 time)
 Pro Wrestling Illustrated
 Ranked No. 99 of the top 500 singles wrestlers in the PWI 500 in 2021

References

External links
Impact Wrestling profile

1987 births
Living people
Mexican male professional wrestlers
Masked wrestlers
Unidentified wrestlers
Professional wrestlers from Coahuila
People from Torreón
21st-century professional wrestlers
AAA Latin American Champions
AAA World Trios Champions